Chesi is an Italian surname. Notable people with the surname include:
 Gert Chesi (born 1940), Austrian photographer, author, journalist and filmmaker
 Pietro Chesi (1902–1944), Italian cyclist
  (1916–1991), Italian journalist

Italian-language surnames